Per Olaf Lundteigen (born 18 April 1953) is a Norwegian farmer and politician for the Centre Party.

Career
He was born in Vestfossen, took his secondary education in Hokksund in 1972 and the cand.agric. degree at the Norwegian College of Agriculture in 1977. From 1977 to 1979 he worked as a secretary in the Norwegian Agrarian Association. After three years in Ringebu municipality he settled as a farmer in 1982. From 1986 to 1992 he chaired the Norwegian Farmers' and Smallholders' Union.

He was elected to the Norwegian Parliament from Buskerud in 1993. Not re-elected in 1997, he was secretary general in his party for two years. From 1999 to 2000, while the first cabinet Bondevik held office, he was a State Secretary in the Ministry of Local Government. From 2000 to 2003 he chaired the county chapter of his party, and from 2003 to 2007 he served in Øvre Eiker municipal council. In 2005 he was elected to the Norwegian Parliament for a second term. During both terms he has been a member of the Standing Committee of Finance.

References

1953 births
Living people
Centre Party (Norway) politicians
Buskerud politicians
Members of the Storting
Norwegian state secretaries
Norwegian College of Agriculture alumni
Norwegian farmers
21st-century Norwegian politicians
20th-century Norwegian politicians
People from Øvre Eiker